Claude Demassieux (born 4 July 1946) is a French politician from Rally for the Republic, who served as a member of the National Assembly between 1993 and 1997, representing the Pas-de-Calais's 7th constituency.

References 

1946 births
Living people
20th-century French politicians
People from Calais
People from Pas-de-Calais
Rally for the Republic politicians
Politicians from Hauts-de-France
Deputies of the 10th National Assembly of the French Fifth Republic
Members of Parliament for Pas-de-Calais